This article provides information on candidates who stood for the 1983 Australian federal election. The election was held on 5 March 1983.

Retiring Members and Senators

Labor
 John Armitage MP (Chifley, NSW)
 Moss Cass MP (Maribyrnong, Vic)
 Ted Innes MP (Melbourne, Vic)
 Charles Jones MP (Newcastle, NSW)
 Les McMahon MP (Sydney, NSW)
 Laurie Wallis MP (Grey, SA)
Senator Jim Keeffe (Qld)
Senator Geoff McLaren (SA)
Senator Tony Mulvihill (NSW)

Liberal
 Geoffrey Giles MP (Wakefield, SA)

National
 Peter Nixon MP (Gippsland, Vic)

House of Representatives
Sitting members at the time of the election are shown in bold text. Successful candidates are highlighted in the relevant colour. Where there is possible confusion, an asterisk (*) is also used.

Australian Capital Territory

New South Wales

Northern Territory

Queensland

South Australia

Tasmania

Victoria

Western Australia

Senate
Sitting Senators are shown in bold text. Since this was a double dissolution election, all senators were up for re-election. The first five successful candidates from each state were elected to six-year terms, the remaining five to three-year terms. Tickets that elected at least one Senator are highlighted in the relevant colour. Successful candidates are identified by an asterisk (*).

Australian Capital Territory
Two seats were up for election. The Labor Party was defending one seat. The Liberal Party was defending one seat.

New South Wales
Ten seats were up for election. The Labor Party was defending five seats. The Liberal-National Coalition was defending four seats. The Australian Democrats were defending one seat.

Northern Territory
Two seats were up for election. The Labor Party was defending one seat. The Country Liberal Party was defending one seat.

Queensland
Ten seats were up for election. The Labor Party was defending four seats. The Liberal Party was defending three seats (although Liberal Senator Neville Bonner was contesting the election as an independent). The National Party was defending two seats. The Australian Democrats were defending one seat.

South Australia
Ten seats were up for election. The Labor Party was defending four seats. The Liberal Party was defending five seats. The Australian Democrats were defending one seat.

Tasmania
Ten seats were up for election. The Labor Party was defending four seats. The Liberal Party was defending five seats. Independent Senator Brian Harradine was defending one seat.

Victoria
Ten seats were up for election. The Labor Party was defending four seats. The Liberal-National Coalition was defending four seats. The Australian Democrats were defending two seats.

Western Australia
Ten seats were up for election. The Labor Party was defending four seats. The Liberal Party was defending six seats.

Summary by party 

Beside each party is the number of seats contested by that party in the House of Representatives for each state, as well as an indication of whether the party contested the Senate election in the respective state.

See also
 1983 Australian federal election
 Members of the Australian House of Representatives, 1980–1983
 Members of the Australian House of Representatives, 1983–1984
 Members of the Australian Senate, 1981–1983
 Members of the Australian Senate, 1983–1985
 List of political parties in Australia

References
Adam Carr's Election Archive - House of Representatives 1983
Adam Carr's Election Archive - Senate 1983

1983 elections in Australia
Candidates for Australian federal elections